The 2017 Cornwall Council election was held on 4 May 2017 as part of the 2017 local elections in the United Kingdom. 122 councillors were elected from the 121 electoral divisions of Cornwall Council, which returned either one or two councillors each by first-past-the-post voting for a four-year term of office. Although originally scheduled to take place on the same day, the election in the Bodmin St Petroc ward was countermanded following the death of Liberal Democrat candidate Steve Rogerson and was held on 8 June.

Background 

The elections for Cornwall Council is the third since its creation in 2009. Cornwall had previously been administered as a non-metropolitan county, with local government powers split between Cornwall County Council and the six non-metropolitan districts of Caradon, Carrick, Kerrier, North Cornwall, Penwith and Restormel. These were abolished as part of the 2009 structural changes to local government in England, which created a singular unitary authority. The previous two elections resulted in no group gaining a majority, requiring the support of independents for any single party to govern.

All wards were to be contested in the election, with a total of 123 wards being contested (Bude electing 2 councillors for a total of 123 available seats overall). The Liberal Democrats fielded a candidate in every single ward, followed closely by the Conservatives with 119 candidates. Labour fielded 58,  the Green Party and UKIP each stood 21, and Cornish nationalist party Mebyon Kernow stood 19. The Liberal Party in Cornwall and TUSC stood two candidates each. 83 independents were also standing, with some wards having multiple independent candidates.

Elections to town and parish councils across Cornwall were also scheduled to take place on 4 May. However, not all council elections were contested, as the number of candidates was not greater than the seats available. Councils that have vacancies after the elections may attempt to co-opt additional councillors.

Eligibility 

All locally registered electors (British, Irish, Commonwealth and European Union citizens) who are aged 18 or over on Thursday 4 May 2017 will be entitled to vote in the local elections. Those who are temporarily away from their ordinary address (for example, away working, on holiday, in student accommodation or in hospital) are also entitled to vote in the local elections, although those who had moved abroad and registered as overseas electors cannot vote in the local elections. It is possible to register to vote at more than one address (such as a university student who had a term-time address and lives at home during holidays) at the discretion of the local Electoral Register Office, but it remains an offence to vote more than once in the same local government election.

Composition before election

Results summary

|}

Electoral division results 

The electoral division results listed below are based on the changes from the 2013 elections, not taking into account any mid-term by-elections or party defections.

The election for a councillor to represent the Bodmin St Petroc division was postponed to 8 June due to the death of the incumbent Liberal Democrat councillor Steve Rogerson during the campaign.

References

2017
2017 English local elections
2010s in Cornwall